The Baynes Sound Connector is a car ferry owned and operated by B.C. Ferries that runs between Buckley Bay on Vancouver Island and Denman Island. It is the first and only cable ferry in the BC Ferries fleet and replaced the self-propelled MV Quinitsa in February 2016.

Red and green transit lights are installed at both Buckley Bay and Denman West terminals facing oncoming marine traffic in each direction. It is illegal to cross the channel while the red light is on, signifying the ferry is in transit.

The crossing of approximately 1900 metres is the longest cable ferry crossing in the world.

The ferry was built by Seaspan at its Vancouver Shipyards at a cost of CAD$15 Million. It is a 258-foot-long ferry designed for 150 passengers and 50 vehicles.

Its construction suffered delays and trial mishaps and the project has been drawing heavy criticism for using more fuel than the previous ship and for a lower service reliability notably caused by the downtime during excessive wind speed. BC Ferries denied the allegations.

External links
Ship in service video

References

2015 ships
Ships of BC Ferries
Cable ferries in Canada